Elliot Gómez López (born 11 June 1999) is a Spanish professional footballer who plays as a left winger for Hércules CF, on loan from CD Tenerife.

Club career
Born in Güímar, Tenerife, Canary Islands, Gómez joined Real Madrid's La Fábrica in 2013, from CD Tenerife. On 18 July 2018, after finishing his formation, he was loaned to Segunda División B side Burgos CF for the season.

Gómez made his senior debut on 25 August 2018, playing the last nine minutes in a 0–2 away loss against SD Ponferradina. The following 31 January, after just one start in seven appearances, his loan was cut short, and subsequently terminated his deal with Los Blancos. On 5 February 2019, he returned to his former club Tenerife, being assigned to the reserves in Tercera División.

Gómez made his professional debut on 22 November 2019, coming on as a late substitute for goalscorer Suso Santana in a 2–0 away defeat of Sporting de Gijón in the Segunda División championship. The following 10 June, he extended his contract until 2021.

On 2 October 2020, Gómez further extended his contract until 2023, and was immediately loaned to Real Valladolid Promesas in the third tier, for the season. The following 23 August, he moved to Segunda División RFEF side Hércules CF also in a temporary deal.

References

External links
Real Madrid profile

1999 births
Living people
People from Tenerife
Sportspeople from the Province of Santa Cruz de Tenerife
Spanish footballers
Footballers from the Canary Islands
Association football wingers
Segunda División players
Segunda División B players
Tercera División players
Real Madrid Castilla footballers
Burgos CF footballers
CD Tenerife B players
CD Tenerife players
Real Valladolid Promesas players
Hércules CF players